Rocío de Meer Méndez (born 26 December, 1989) is a Spanish lawyer and politician who has been a member of the Congress of Deputies since 2019 for Vox.

Méndez was born to a military family in Madrid. One of her grandparents was Colonel and politician Carlos de Meer de Ribera, the last civil governor of the Balearic Islands. She studied law at the  Complutense University of Madrid where she became president of the university's debate society. During this time, she met and became friends with future Vox leader Santiago Abascal.

In the April 2019 elections she was elected as a deputy to the Congress of Deputies representing the Almeria constituency. She was re-elected in the subsequent election in November.

References 

1989 births
Living people
Members of the 13th Congress of Deputies (Spain)
Members of the 14th Congress of Deputies (Spain)
Vox (political party) politicians
Spanish women lawyers
Spanish women in politics
Lawyers from Madrid
21st-century Spanish lawyers